Nymphicula is a genus of moths of the family Crambidae.

Species
Nymphicula acuminatalis Snellen, 1880
Nymphicula adelphalis D. Agassiz, 2014
Nymphicula albibasalis Yoshiyasu, 1980
Nymphicula albidorsalis Speidel, 1998
Nymphicula argyrochrysalis Mabille, 1900
Nymphicula atriterminalis (Hampson, 1917)
Nymphicula australis (C. Felder, R. Felder & Rogenhofer, 1875)
Nymphicula banauensis Speidel, 2003
Nymphicula beni Agassiz, 2014
Nymphicula blandialis (Walker, 1859)
Nymphicula bombayensis (Swinhoe & Cotes, 1889)
Nymphicula callichromalis (Mabille, 1878)
Nymphicula cheesmanae Agassiz, 2014
Nymphicula christinae Agassiz, 2014
Nymphicula concaviuscula You, Li & Wang, 2003
Nymphicula conjunctalis Agassiz, 2014
Nymphicula cyanolitha (Meyrick, 1886)
Nymphicula diehlalis (Marion, 1957)
Nymphicula drusiusalis (Walker, 1859)
Nymphicula eberti Speidel, 1998
Nymphicula edwardsi Agassiz, 2014
Nymphicula fionae Agassiz, 2014
Nymphicula hampsoni Agassiz, 2014
Nymphicula hexaxantha Agassiz, 2012
Nymphicula infuscatalis Snellen, 1880
Nymphicula insulalis Agassiz, 2014
Nymphicula irianalis Agassiz, 2014
Nymphicula junctalis (Hampson, 1891)
Nymphicula kinabaluensis Mey, 2009
Nymphicula lactealis Agassiz, 2014
Nymphicula lifuensis Agassiz, 2014
Nymphicula luzonensis Yoshiyasu, 1997
Nymphicula manilensis Sauber in Semper, 1899
Nymphicula mesorphna (Meyrick, 1894)
Nymphicula meyi Speidel, 1998
Nymphicula michaeli Agassiz, 2014
Nymphicula mindorensis Speidel, 2003
Nymphicula monticola Agassiz, 2014
Nymphicula morimotoi Yoshiyasu, 1997
Nymphicula negrosensis Speidel, 2003
Nymphicula nigristriata (Hampson, 1917)
Nymphicula nigritalis (Hampson, 1893)
Nymphicula nigrolunalis Speidel, 1998
Nymphicula nokensis Agassiz, 2014
Nymphicula nyasalis (Hampson, 1917)
Nymphicula ochrepunctalis Agassiz, 2014
Nymphicula patnalis (C. Felder, R. Felder & Rogenhofer, 1875)
Nymphicula perirrorata (Hampson, 1917)
Nymphicula plumbilinealis Agassiz, 2014
Nymphicula queenslandica (Hampson, 1917)
Nymphicula saigusai Yoshiyasu, 1980
Nymphicula samarensis Speidel, 2003
Nymphicula samoensis Agassiz, 2014
Nymphicula silauensis Mey, 2009
Nymphicula stipalis Snellen, 1880
Nymphicula submarginalis Agassiz, 2014
Nymphicula susannae Agassiz, 2014
Nymphicula tariensis Agassiz, 2014
Nymphicula torresalis Agassiz, 2014
Nymphicula trimacula (Hampson, 1891)
Nymphicula tripunctata Yoshiyasu, 1987
Nymphicula xanthobathra (Meyrick, 1894)
Nymphicula xanthocostalis Agassiz, 2014
Nymphicula yoshiyasui D. J. L. Agassiz, 2002
Nymphicula zambalensis Speidel, 2003

Former species
Nymphicula capensis (Hampson, 1906)
Nymphicula dorophanes (Meyrick, 1937)
Nymphicula lithorma (Meyrick, 1936)
Nymphicula mimicalis (Hampson, 1917)
Nymphicula sphragidacma (Meyrick, 1937)
Nymphicula tetropalis (Hampson, 1906)
Nymphicula triopalis (Hampson, 1906)

References

 , 2002: Nymphicula yoshiyasui n. sp. (Lepidoptera: Pyralidae: Nymphulinae) from Japan. Entomological Science 5 (2): 259–261. Full article: 
 , 2014: A preliminary study of the genus Nymphicula Snellen from Australia, New Guinea and the South Pacific (Lepidoptera: Pyraloidea: Crambidae: Acentropinae). Zootaxa, 3774 (5): 401–429.
 , 2009: New aquatic moths from high elevations of Mt. Kinabalu in northern Borneo (Lepidoptera: Pyraloidea: Acentropinae). Entomologische Zeitschrift 119 (3). 99-107.
 , 2003: New species of Aquatic moths from the Philippines (Lepidoptera: Crambidae). Insecta Koreana 20 (1): 7-49.
 , 1999: Catalogue of the Oriental Acentropinae (Lepidoptera: Crambidae). Tijdschrift voor Entomologie 142 (1): 125–142. Full article: .
 , 1980: A systematic study of the genus Nymphicula Snellen from Japan (Lepidoptera: Pyralidae). Tyô to Ga 31 (1-2): 1-28. Abstract and full article: .
 , 1997: Descriptions of three Nymphicula species from the Philippines (Lepidoptera: Crambidae). Esakia 37: 161–172.
 , 2003: A study on the genus Nymphicula Snellen, 1880 (Lepidoptera: Crambidae: Nymphulinae) from China, with description of one new species. Entomotaxonomia 25 (1): 67–72.

External links

 
Acentropinae
Crambidae genera